The FIBT World Championships 1998 took place in St. Moritz, Switzerland for the record nineteenth time. The Swiss city had hosted the event previously in 1931 (Four-man), 1935 (Four-man), 1937 (Four-man), 1938 (Two-man), 1939 (Two-man), 1947, 1955, 1957, 1959, 1965, 1970, 1974, 1977, 1982, 1987, 1989 (Skeleton), 1990 (Bobsleigh), and 1997 (Bobsleigh). This championship event was an extraordinary event since skeleton was not included in the program at the 1998 Winter Olympics in Nagano, Japan.

Men's skeleton

Medal table

References
Men's skeleton World Champions

IBSF World Championships
1998 in skeleton
Sport in St. Moritz
1998 in bobsleigh
1998 in Swiss sport
International sports competitions hosted by Switzerland
Bobsleigh in Switzerland